Usnea glabrescens is a species of beard lichen in the family Parmeliaceae. It grows on bark, has a shrubby thallus with a blackened base, and a thick cortex. Several chemotypes of this species have been reported. The lichen is widely distributed in Europe.

References

glabrescens
Lichen species
Lichens described in 1878
Lichens of Europe
Taxa named by Edvard August Vainio